There are several rivers named Jacuípe River in Brazil:

 Jacuípe River (Bahia)
 Jacuípe River (Paraíba), a river of Paraíba
 Jacuípe River (Pernambuco)